Joseph Montfort (c. 1730 – 25 March 1776) was a wealthy North Carolinian land owner and an active Freemason, noted to be the one and only Grand Master of and for American Freemasons.

Life
We know little about Montfort’s early life.  Although it has been thought that he was born in England this is improbable. We know that he settled in North Carolina in 1752 having migrated from Virginia in his early to mid-twenties, and married Priscilla, a daughter of Colonel Benjamin Hill, a planter and trader.  Montfort became a successful merchant and planter and like others of his Rank was active in civic affairs, representing Halifax in the colonial assembly from 1766 to 1774 and eventually serving as a treasurer of the northern part of the colony.

Eventually becoming one of the wealthiest North Carolinians of the period, Montfort owned more than 30,000 acres scattered in tracts across the province.  He was active in freemasonry from the 1760s. and was instrumental in forming the Royal White Hart lodge in Halifax, NC, and in obtaining a second warrant for the lodge from the Grand Lodge of England under the hand of Henry Somerset, 5th Duke of Beaufort (1744-1803), Grand Master of the Grand Lodge of England 1767-72, which Montfort presented to the lodge on his return to Halifax in May 1768.

Following the death of Benjamin Smith (1715-1770), Provincial Grand Master for North and South Carolina,  Beaufort issued a deputation to Montfort appointing him ‘Provincial Grand Master of and for America’, although the relevant Grand Lodge Minutes are phrased Provincial G. M. for North Carolina’.  The deputation is dated 14 January 1771.  Montfort’s gravestone at the Royal White Hart Lodge in Halifax reads ‘The highest masonic official ever reigning on this continent…the first, the last, the only Grand Master of America’.

Montfort visited England in the winter of 1767 with a fellow North Carolinian planter, Alexander McCulloh, and it is during this time in London that he would have sat for Nathaniel Dance-Holland to have his portrait executed, see Portrait on this page.  Montfort was known for his extravagance in matters masonic and for purchasing expensive lodge furniture, glassware and porcelain, as well as for acquiring paintings, sculptures and other furnishings for himself to send back to North Carolina.

Montfort’s journey to London would not only have provided the opportunity to obtain a new and more prestigious lodge warrant from the Grand Lodge of England, but also to advance his case as Provincial Grand Master.

Joseph Montfort was a delegate to the Second North Carolina Provincial Congress from the town of Halifax, North Carolina.

Montfort died from pulmonary problems in 1776.

References

Some material was copied from Theo Johns Fine Art, which is available under a Attribution-ShareAlike 3.0 Unported license and GFDL.

American Freemasons
1730s births
1776 deaths
Year of birth uncertain
Members of the North Carolina Provincial Congresses